Bioscope is an Indian Marathi language anthology drama film consisting of four short films directed by Ravi Jadhav , Girish Mohite , Viju Mane and Gajendra Ahire and produced by Abhay Shevade. Narrated by Gulzar. The film was released on 17 July 2015.

Synopsis 
An anthology of stories dealing with ambitions of accomplished musicians, insecurities of a shy man who is in love, the frustration of an educated farmer and a young woman's sexuality.

Cast
Mitraa
 Veena Jamkar
 Mrunmayee Deshpande
Bail
 Mangesh Desai
 Smita Tambe
 Uday Sabnis
 Sagar Karande
Ek Hota Kau
 Kushal Badrike
 Spruha Joshi
Dili E Nadaan
 Neena Kulkarni
 Suhas
 Neha Pendse

Soundtrack

Critical response 
Bioscope received positive reviews from critics. Mihir Bhanage of The Times of India gave the film 4 stars out of 5 and was appreciative "It combines the power of short films with the reputation of the directors to give something that is much needed in the industry; the scope for fearless experimentation. Come what may, don’t miss this one". Soumitra Pote of Maharashtra Times also gave it 4 stars out of 5 and similarly found that "Every Marathi mind should take note of these efforts made by these four directors. This experiment of making a film on poetry should also be appreciated". Ganesh Matkari of Pune Mirror wrote "It is easily accessible and maybe suggests a new direction for Marathi Cinema - the possible merging of the blockbuster with the art-house". Jayanti Waghdhare of Zee News gave the film a rating of 3.5/5 and wrote "This experiment is being seen for the first time in Marathi cinema. 'Icing on the cake' means Gulzar's voice from the movie Bioscope. These poems have been presented in the voice of Gulzar himself". A reviewer from Loksatta wrote "All these four short films in Bioscope. Gulzar's poetic description of the bioscope at the beginning of the film seems to be very useful".

References

External links
 
 

2015 films
2010s Marathi-language films
Indian drama films